Eilis McGovern FRCSI is an Irish consultant cardiothoracic surgeon. She established Ireland's third public cardiac unit and was the 168th President of the Royal College of Surgeons in Ireland. She became the National Director for medical training at the Health Service Executive, Ireland, in 2012.

Early life
Eilis McGovern was born in 1958 in Mount Charles, County Donegal, and attended school at the St Louis Convent Monaghan.

Education and training
McGovern studied medicine at University College Dublin. When she graduated in 1978, she also won the gold medal in surgery and the silver medal in medicine. After this initial training, she went on to come first in the fellowship examination for the Royal College of Surgeons in Ireland.

Medical career
In 2010, McGovern became the 168th President of the Royal College of Surgeons in Ireland. She was the first woman to hold the position in the 226-year history of the institution.

References

Living people
Irish surgeons
Alumni of University College Dublin
Irish cardiac surgeons
Irish women medical doctors
Year of birth missing (living people)